Seth De Witt Sigsby (born Seth De Witt, April 30, 1874 – September 15, 1953), was a Major League Baseball pitcher who played in  with the New York Giants.

He was born in Cobleskill, New York and died in Schenectady, New York.

External links

1874 births
1953 deaths
Major League Baseball pitchers
Baseball players from New York (state)
New York Giants (NL) players
19th-century baseball players
Troy Trojans (minor league) players
Albany Senators players
Buffalo Bisons (minor league) players
People from Cobleskill, New York
Sportspeople from Schenectady, New York